Vágner Silva de Souza (born 11 June 1984), known as Vágner Love, is a Brazilian professional footballer who plays as a striker for Sport Recife. He is a forward who has been described by World Soccer Magazine as possessing "mobility, flair, awareness and powerful shooting".

The second name Love was given to Vágner while playing for Palmeiras as he was known for his playboy lifestyle.

Over two spells, Vágner Love scored 117 goals across 241 official games in eight seasons at CSKA Moscow. He won 14 honours in the Russian capital, scoring in their win in the 2005 UEFA Cup Final to become the youngest player to score in a UEFA Cup final.

Vágner Love scored four goals in 20 games for the Brazil national team, winning the Copa América in 2004 and 2007.

Club career

Palmeiras
Vágner Love started his career with Palmeiras. In the 2003 season, he helped them to return to the Série A, the nation's top-flight division.

CSKA Moscow
In the summer of 2004, Vágner Love was bought by Russian Premier League club CSKA Moscow. For over a year after his arrival, rumours kept appearing that he did not want to stay in Moscow, and a transfer to Corinthians in particular was hinted at numerous times. These rumours, however, eventually subsided, and he mentioned a number of times that he was fully committed to his contract and is looking forward to completing its full tenure.

In addition to winning the UEFA Cup, he has gone on to win the Russian Premier League title and Russian Cup in both 2005 and 2008, as well as the Russian Super Cup in 2006.

Vágner Love became the top scorer in the 2008 season (the first top scorer from outside the former Soviet Union) and the top scorer of the 2008–09 UEFA Cup, the latter with 11 goals in 8 games.

Return to Palmeiras on loan
On 28 August 2009, following a run of poor form for CSKA, Vágner Love was signed by his former club Palmeiras on a one-year loan deal until 31 July 2010. CSKA press spokesman Sergei Aksenov claimed that Vágner Love left Russia due to "urgent family problems demand(ing) his presence at home in Brazil".

Vágner Love had a respectable return of 5 goals in 12 games for Palmeiras, but his loan spell was ended prematurely: After publicly stating his concern over his safety at Palmeiras due to off-field altercations with fans, as well as his desire to play for his childhood team Flamengo, the deal was ended early on 14 January 2010.

Flamengo
On 15 January 2010, the day after his loan was terminated with Palmeiras, Vágner Love officially signed a loan deal with reigning Brazilian champions Flamengo, through till July 2010. He made his Flamengo debut against Bangu in the Campeonato Carioca on 23 January 2010, scoring two goals.

Vágner Love performed very well playing for Flamengo, scoring 23 goals in 26 matches. His successful strike partnership with Adriano was dubbed by fans as "Império do Amor", or "The Love Empire", in reference to Adriano's nickname "The Emperor" and Vágner Love's artistic surname. The presence of midfielder Dejan Petković in Flamengo's squad made supporters start the year with high expectations—it was widely believed that the Serbian's passing and free-kick abilities, coupled with Adriano's and Vagner's prolific scoring, would produce a top team.

However, with Adriano struggling to keep an athlete's body mass index, and Petković's legs growing old (he was already 37 then), the team failed to advance past the quarter-finals in the 2010 Copa Libertadores. Shortly after, Adriano revealed he wanted to try playing in Italy again, and Flamengo could not convince CSKA to extend Vágner Love's loan, thus dismantling the once-promising "Love Empire".

Return to CSKA

After a change of presidency, on 12 January 2013, Flamengo did not pay his pendencies of rights with CSKA, and Vágner Love had to leave the club, returning to Russia after a one-year absence. On 16 January, he was "re-presented" in Moscow and signed a three-year contract extension. He continued his goal scoring record with CSKA on his return to the club, and propelled the club to the Premier League title in 2013 after a goalless draw with Kuban Krasnodar on 18 May, the club's first league title since 2006.

Shandong Luneng
On 24 July 2013, Vágner Love transferred to Chinese Super League side Shandong Luneng in a reported €12 million transfer.

Corinthians
On 8 February 2015, Vágner Love rescinded his contract with Shandong Luneng and signed with Corinthians in Brazil. He went on to become the top scorer of the club during the national championship as Corinthians went on to win the Série A that year.

Monaco
On 13 January 2016, Ligue 1 club Monaco announced the signing of Vágner Love on an 18-month deal for a €1 million transfer fee. On 20 March, he opened the scoring in an eventual 2–0 win against Paris Saint-Germain, the Parisian club's first home defeat since May 2014.

Alanyaspor
On 30 August 2016, Turkish Süper Lig club Alanyaspor reached an agreement with Monaco for the transfer of Love. On 31 August 2016, he was officially presented after passed the medical. Having failed to score in his first seven appearances for the club, Love scored 23 goals in 20 matches that followed to earn the Golden Boot award.

Beşiktaş
On 26 January 2018, Turkish Süper Lig club Beşiktaş reached an agreement with Alanyaspor for the transfer of Love.

Return to Corinthians 
On 25 January 2019, Love returned to Corinthians on a deal until the end of 2020 after rescinding his contract with Beşiktaş. He rescinded his contract in June 2020.

Kairat
On 8 July 2020, Kazakhstan Premier League club FC Kairat announced the signing of Vágner Love on a six-month contract, with the option to extend it.
On 3 November 2020, Love scored Kairat's first goal, in a 3–1 win over Ordabasy, to clinch their first Kazakhstan Premier League title since 2004. On 5 November 2020, Kairat extended their contract with Vágner Love until the end of the 2021 season.

Midtjylland
On 20 January 2022, Love signed an agreement to join Midtjylland on a free transfer, with a contract lasting until the end of the 2021/22 season. On 22 May 2022 Midtjylland confirmed, that Love was one out of seven players, which contracts had came to an end, and therefore would leave the club.

Sport Recife 
On 26 July 2022, Love returned to Brazil after two years, joining Série A side Sport Recife until the end of the year.

On 6 January 2023, the forward renewed his contract with the club for another season.

International career
Vágner Love earned his first call up for the Brazil national football team for the 2004 Copa América, in a squad without the main stars to give them rest after the end of the 2003–04 season. He made his debut as a substitute in the 4–1 win against Costa Rica, which was his single appearance as Brazil went on to win the competition.

He did not make the final 23-man squad for the 2006 FIFA World Cup in Germany. Following the tournament, Vágner Love was named in new manager Dunga's first squad for the national team and scored his first goal for the Seleção in the same year, against Wales.

The following year, he was included in Brazil's squad for the 2007 Copa América. On 7 July 2007, he scored the final goal in a 6–1 win against Chile in the quarter-finals of the competition. He played his last match for the national team in that year, against Uruguay. Over the course of his international career, he amassed 20 caps and scored 4 goals.

Career statistics

Club

International
Updated 1 April 2009

''Scores and results table. Brazil's goal tally first:

Honours
Palmeiras
Campeonato Brasileiro Série B: 2003

CSKA Moscow
Russian Premier League: 2005, 2006, 2012–13
Russian Cup: 2004–05, 2005–06, 2007–08, 2008–09, 2010–11, 2012–13
Russian Super Cup: 2006, 2007, 2009, 2013
UEFA Cup: 2004–05

Shandong Luneng
Chinese FA Cup: 2014

Corinthians
Campeonato Brasileiro Série A: 2015
Campeonato Paulista: 2019

Kairat
Kazakhstan Premier League: 2020
Kazakhstan Cup: 2021
Brazil
Copa América: 2004, 2007
Individual
 Campeonato Brasileiro Série B Top scorer: 2003
 Pan American Games Top scorer: 2003
 Campeonato Paulista Top scorer: 2004
 Russian Premier League Top scorer: 2008
 Sport-Expresss Russian Footballer of the Year: 2008
 Russian Premier League Team of the Year: 2008, 2012–13
 UEFA Cup Top scorer: 2008–09
 Campeonato Carioca Top scorer: 2010
 Russian Premier League Player of the Month: March 2013, May 2013
 Süper Lig Top scorer: 2016–17

References

External links
 

1984 births
Living people
Brazilian footballers
Association football forwards
Brazil international footballers
PFC CSKA Moscow players
UEFA Cup winning players
Shandong Taishan F.C. players
Sociedade Esportiva Palmeiras players
CR Flamengo footballers
Sport Club Corinthians Paulista players
Sport Club do Recife players
AS Monaco FC players
Alanyaspor footballers
Beşiktaş J.K. footballers
FC Kairat players
FC Midtjylland players
2004 Copa América players
2007 Copa América players
Pan American Games medalists in football
Pan American Games silver medalists for Brazil
Copa América-winning players
Campeonato Brasileiro Série A players
Campeonato Brasileiro Série B players
Russian Premier League players
Chinese Super League players
Ligue 1 players
Süper Lig players
Danish Superliga players
Brazilian expatriate footballers
Brazilian expatriate sportspeople in China
Brazilian expatriate sportspeople in Russia
Expatriate footballers in Russia
Expatriate footballers in China
Brazilian expatriate sportspeople in Monaco
Expatriate footballers in Monaco
Brazilian expatriate sportspeople in Turkey
Expatriate footballers in Turkey
Brazilian expatriate sportspeople in Denmark
Expatriate men's footballers in Denmark
Footballers from Rio de Janeiro (city)
Footballers at the 2003 Pan American Games
Medalists at the 2003 Pan American Games